Sporobolus airoides is a species of grass known by the common name alkali sacaton. It is native to western North America, including the Western United States west of the Mississippi River, British Columbia and Alberta in Canada, and northern and central Mexico. It grows in many types of habitat, often in alkali soils, such as in California desert regions.

Description
The stem bases are thick and tough, almost woody in texture. The inflorescence is long and generally wide open and spreading, bearing yellow spikelets with purplish bases. The grass produces abundant seeds, which are often dispersed in flowing water and germinate when embedded in sediment.

Halophyte – salinity
Sporobolus airoides is a facultative halophyte, able to grow in soils with high salt concentrations.  This grass germinates best in warm, sunny, wet conditions, and it can easily move into saline soils such as those in alkali flats when the substrate is wet.

Cultivation
It is a valuable grass for habitat restoration and revegetation projects in disturbed habitat in the Southwest United States, especially in riparian zones in California and the Intermountain West.

Mojave Desert
It is planted with Muhlenbergia asperifolia (scratchgrass) for Mojave River and other riparian zone restoration in the Mojave Desert. It produces dense groundcover once established.

References

External links
Jepson Manual Treatment – Sporobolus airoides
USDA Plants Profile: Sporobolus airoides
Grass Manual Treatment – Sporobolus airoides
FAO Grassland Index
Sporobolus airoides – Photo gallery

airoides
Bunchgrasses of North America
Native grasses of California
Grasses of Canada
Grasses of the United States
Flora of the California desert regions
Flora of the Great Basin
Flora of the Sierra Nevada (United States)
Flora of the Sonoran Deserts
Flora of the Northwestern United States
Flora of the Southwestern United States
Natural history of the California chaparral and woodlands
Natural history of the Central Valley (California)
Natural history of the Peninsular Ranges
Natural history of the Santa Monica Mountains
Natural history of the Transverse Ranges
Natural history of the Mojave Desert
North American desert flora
Flora of the Western United States
Garden plants of North America
Drought-tolerant plants
Flora without expected TNC conservation status